Currumbin Waters is a suburb in the City of Gold Coast, Queensland, Australia. It borders New South Wales.

Geography
Currumbin Waters is bounded to the south by the Queensland border with New South Wales, to the east by the Pacific Motorway, to the north by Guineas Creek Road, and to the west by Simpsons Road and Piggabeen Road.

Currumbin Creek flows through the suburb from the south-west (Currumbin Valley) towards the north (Palm Beach and Currumbin) where it enters the Coral Sea.

Currumbin Waters has a variety of land uses. North of the creek is residential. South of the creek there is an industrial estate in the north-east of the suburb. There is a residential canal estate in the centre of the suburb with normal residential use in the east. In the south-east of the locality the land is used for farming, mostly grazing on native vegetation.

History
The name Currumbin Waters was originally a real estate development name. The name Currumbin is from the Bundjalung language (Ngaraangbal dialect), which means either high or high trees or may be a corruption of kurrohmin meaning kangaroo.

Coolangatta Special School opened on 1 January 1979 in Coolangatta. On 1 July 2006, the school was relocated to Currumbin Waters and renamed Currumbin Community Special School.

St Augustine's Catholic School was established in 1926 by the Daughters of Our Lady of the Sacred Heart in Coolangatta. From 1950 the school was operated by Missionary Franciscan Sisters of the Immaculate Conception. On 27 January 1987 the school relocated to a new site in Currumbin Waters. In 1992 the sisters ended their association with the school which is now under lay administration.

In the  Currumbin Waters had a population of 8,883, 51.8% female and 48.2% male. The median age of the Currumbin Waters population was 42 years, 5 years above the national median of 37.  76.7% of people living in Currumbin Waters were born in Australia. The other top responses for country of birth were England 5.3%, New Zealand 4.8%, Germany 0.7%, Scotland 0.6%, South Africa 0.5%.  91% of people spoke only English at home; the next most common languages were 0.5% German, 0.5% Japanese, 0.2% Tagalog, 0.2% Portuguese, 0.2% Italian.

Education 
St Augustine's Parish Primary School is a Catholic primary (Prep-6) school for boys and girls at Galleon Way. In 2017, the school had an enrolment of 463 students with 32 teachers (25 full-time equivalent) and 17 non-teaching staff (10 full-time equivalent).

Currumbin Community Special School is a special primary and secondary (Prep-12) school for boys and girls at 5 Hammersford Drive. In 2017, the school had an enrolment of 87 students with 31 teachers (24 full-time equivalent) and 28 non-teaching staff (19 full-time equivalent).

References

External links

 

Suburbs of the Gold Coast, Queensland